"Verdict of Three" is the 31st episode of the second season of the American TV series Playhouse 90. The episode was directed by Buzz Kulik and written by James P. Cavanagh, loosely based on Raymond Postgate's classic novel Verdict of Twelve.

Plot
Marina Arkwright is accused of poisoning her young son and is brought to trial. After her husband's death, Marina turned the boy over to his grandparents in return for a financial settlement. When the grandfather died and the boy was due to come into a sizable inheritance, Marina returned to her child. Three of the jurors selected for the trial bring their own prejudices to the case.

Cast 
 Gladys Cooper as Mrs. Allen 
 Yvonne De Carlo as Marina Arkwright
 Cecil Kellaway as	Dr. Parkes
 Angela Lansbury as Victoria Atkins
 Patrick Macnee as an attorney
 Carmen Mathews as Alice Morris
 Rod Taylor as Francis Allen
 Michael Wilding as Sir John Alexander

References

External links
 
 Brief contemporary review in the TV guide of the Pittsburgh Press.

1958 American television episodes
Playhouse 90 (season 2) episodes